Sticherus lobatus, known as the spreading fan fern, is a small fern found in eastern and southern Australia. It is a common and attractive plant, similar to S. flabellatus but with additional lobed segments. It often forms colonies in open forest areas or on the edge of rainforests.

References 

Gleicheniales
Flora of New South Wales
Flora of Queensland
Flora of Victoria (Australia)
Flora of Tasmania